El rosario is a 1944 Mexican romantic drama film directed by Juan José Ortega. The film is based on a novel by Florence L. Barclay. It stars Andrea Palma, Tomás Perrín, and Tana Devodier.

References

External links
 

1944 films
1944 romantic drama films
Mexican black-and-white films
Mexican romantic drama films
1940s Mexican films